A direct-entry midwife is a midwife who has become credentialed without first becoming a nurse.  There are direct-entry midwifery programs that prepare students to become Certified Nurse Midwives (CNMs) or Certified Professional Midwives (CPMs). Certified Professional Midwives are known for being "more natural and less intervention oriented." In other words, these midwives typically work outside of the hospital setting in homes and birth centers and do not employ methods for childbirth that physicians in hospitals commonly use such as caesarean section, forceps and other types of equipment and drugs.

Legality of direct-entry midwifery in the United States 

While direct-entry midwifery is popular and legal in many cultures around the world, it struggles to gain legality in several states in the U.S. Nurse-midwives can practice legally in all 50 states. However, Certified Professional Midwives are regulated and licensed in 23 states.

23 states do not regulate Certified Professional Midwives or provide an avenue for licensure. Penalties for practicing as a midwife without a CNM credential range from a misdemeanor to a Class C Felony. These states include Alabama, Connecticut, the District of Columbia, Georgia, Illinois, Iowa, Kansas, Kentucky, Maine, Maryland, Massachusetts, Michigan, Mississippi, Nebraska, Nevada, North Carolina, North Dakota, Ohio, Oklahoma, Pennsylvania, Rhode Island, South Dakota and West Virginia.

North Dakota, for instance, is one of many states that have no official laws regulating or prohibiting the practice of midwives without a CNM credential. States can unintentionally encourage issues with midwifery by not providing standards or licensure opportunities to ensure the competency of midwives.

Also, practicing midwifery without having a CNM credential in these states is basically equivalent to practicing medicine without a license and has severe penalties.

Some states, while they regulate the profession, make it very difficult for midwives to obtain licenses to perform. Hawaii is one of these states. While Certified Professional  Midwifery is legal in Hawaii, licensure has been deemed too expensive and is unavailable to most, according to the Midwives Alliance of North America. Delaware is another state that, while it regulates the profession, sets up obstacles that make it difficult for CPMs to practice in the state. Theoretically, Delaware CPMs are able to obtain a permit to practice, but one hasn’t been issued since 2007.

The decline of midwifery in the United States 
The decline of midwifery in the United States can be contributed to a number of complex factors: the rise of the American Medical Association and the growth of hospitals in the country in the late 1800s and early 1900s shifted births from the home to the hospital.
The fall can also be attributed to the movement toward universities teaching gynecology and surgery as well as advancements in technology such as anesthesia and forceps. All of this led physicians to see midwives as competition instead of partners. They were also worried about what people would think about doctors if it appeared that anyone so uneducated could perform the work of a medical professional.
During this time period, organized medicine launched a  campaign to convince the public that hospital births were the best option, while painting midwives as unintelligent, untrustworthy and criminal. However, it wasn’t just physicians who joined in the campaign against midwifery – by the late nineteenth century, wealthy, pregnant women joined in because they thought childbirth was less painful and safer if performed by physicians.

The case for legalizing certified professional midwifery 

Statistics show that American women want alternatives to hospital births. 20 percent of women indicated in a study in 2006 that if they have the option to have a non-hospital delivery with readily available medical backup, they would take it.
The State of the World’s Midwifery report supports the profession, urging governments to recognize it as vital to maternal and newborn health services. It also urges governments to consider establishing a scope of practice, specified credentials for entering the profession and educational standards.
Those who argue for the legalization of direct-entry midwifery also cite its health benefits, both to the mother and the fetus.
Women who give birth in hospitals experience higher risks and adverse effects than women who give birth with a midwife. Studies also show that the use of midwives in childbirth can decrease maternal and newborn mortality as well as stillbirths, perineal trauma, instrumental births, intrapartum analgesia and anesthesia, severe blood loss, preterm births, newborn infants with low birth weigh, hypothermia and neonatal intensive care units.

There are also indications that midwife-assisted childbirth is safer than birth in a hospital because there’s a lower chance of intervention.

The case against legalizing certified professional midwifery 
Those debating against the legalization of certified professional midwives usually question the competence, regulation and scope of midwives. Questions regarding whether CPMs should be legally recognized as birth attendants, what their job should allow them to do, and who is responsible for their regulation surface. Health care professional also cite recent studies that have shown that hospital births have lower rates of perinatal death, neonatal death, 5-minute Apgar scores < 4, and neonatal seizures when compared to planned out-of-hospital births, including those with a midwife. Also of note, while hospital births are associated with higher rates of intervention such as forceps, labor induction, labor augmentation, and cesarean delivery, the data is skewed, as midwives do not have the necessary training to use the aforementioned techniques when deemed medically necessary.

Common routes for licensure 

Many CPMs also support regulation and licensure because they believe limitations on a legalized profession would outweigh having to operate under the threat of prosecution in states where the profession is illegal. For instance, to qualify for licensure in California, a midwife must complete a three-year postsecondary midwifery education program and pass a licensing examination.
In Minnesota, licensed midwives are required to screen potential clients, and only accept those who are expected to have a “normal” delivery. In 1994, the North American Registry of Midwives (NARM) formed, as it recognized a need for direct-entry midwives to obtain national certification. State regulation of direct-entry midwifery was varied, and the professional associated realized the professional needed certification standards. As of 1994, direct-entry midwives can receive certification through NARM and be designed as certified professional midwives (CPMs). Now, for states that regulate the profession, most of them require midwifery candidates to take the NARM exam and complete NARM certification before receiving a license from the state, however certification and licensure is only recognized in states that legalize and recognize midwifery.” In order to be recognized as a CPM by NARM, a midwife must meet three criteria: meet all education requirements and pass a certification exam; meet minimum experience requirements; document proficiency in all midwifery skills (Stover, 2011, p. 325). This can take anywhere between three and five years. This certification also must be renewed every three years.

References

Midwifery